The Palazzo della Prefettura also called the Palazzo Scotti di Vigoleno is a Baroque architecture-style palace in central Piacenza, region of Emilia-Romagna in Italy. The palace houses the offices of the provincial administration.

History
The palace was commissioned in 1717 by the Marchese Filippo Scotti, and completed in 1727. The architect was Ignazio Cerri, and the palace was intended to house the extended family. The exterior is notable for its baroque balcony. The interior fresco decoration was completed with Rococo scenes by Francesco Natali and Bartolomeo Rusca. The Room of Honor in the palace, also called the Hall of Arms on the basis of the wall decorations has a ceiling fresco depicting the Triumph of the House of Scotti. With the death of the Marchese Gaetano Scotti in 1876, the palace was sold for 70,000 lire to the Provincial government, who converted many of the rooms to offices. The building was looted and damaged in April 1945, at the end of the War, by first the fleeing Fascists and later the partisans.

References

Houses completed in the 18th century
Palaces in Piacenza
Baroque architecture in Piacenza
Government buildings in Italy
18th-century architecture in Italy